The men's K-1 1000 metres event was an individual kayaking event conducted as part of the Canoeing at the 1984 Summer Olympics program.

Medalists

Results

Heats
The 19 competitors first raced in three heats on August 7. The top three finishers from each of the heats advanced directly to the semifinals. All remaining competitors competed in the repechages later that day.

Repechages
Taking place on August 7, two repechages were held. The top four finishers in each repechage advanced to the semifinals.

Semifinals
Raced on August 9, the top three finishers from each of the three semifinals advanced to the final.

Final
The final took place on August 11.

References
1984 Summer Olympics official report Volume 2, Part 2. p. 367. 
Sports-reference.com 1984 K-1 1000 m results.

Men's K-1 1000
Men's events at the 1984 Summer Olympics